Mykola Mykolayovych Yurchenko (born 31 March 1966 in Ivano-Frankivsk) is the Soviet and Ukrainian professional footballer known for his performance in the Ukrainian club Prykarpattia Ivano-Frankivsk. Mykola has an older brother Ihor Yurchenko whose name is also tightly intertwined with the fate of the western Ukrainian club.

Playing career
His primary football development obtained in the Spartak youth academy in Ivano-Frankivsk. He made his professional debut in the tournament for the reserve teams of the Soviet Top League playing for Shakhtar Donetsk. By the end of the 1980s he moved back to the Western Ukraine playing in Ivano-Frankivsk, Lviv, and Drohobych. After a short stint at Kryvbas Yurchenko returned to Prykarpattia. In 1991, he finally made his debut in the Soviet Top League playing for Dynamo Kyiv. With the fall of the Soviet Union he moved to Brno playing in the Czech Premiers. Eventually he returned once again to Prykarpattia where he finished his career in 1995 after the club made to the Ukrainian Premier League.

Honours
 Ukrainian First League champion.

National team
Yurchenko played only a single game for the national team on 15 March 1994. In the game against Israel he substituted Dmytro Mykhaylenko on the 60th minute. Ukraine has lost the game at home 0:1.

References

External links
 Statistics of the player at KLISF 
 National team participation 
 
 
 

1966 births
Living people
Soviet footballers
Ukrainian footballers
Ukraine international footballers
Sportspeople from Ivano-Frankivsk
FC SKA-Karpaty Lviv players
FC Dynamo Kyiv players
FC Spartak Ivano-Frankivsk players
FC Kryvbas Kryvyi Rih players
FC Zbrojovka Brno players
Soviet Top League players
Soviet First League players
Soviet Second League players
Soviet Second League B players
Ukrainian Premier League players
Ukrainian First League players
Expatriate footballers in Czechoslovakia

Association football forwards